Federal Territories is a special political division in the territory of Venezuela. Their existence is provided for in Article 16 of the National Constitution of 1999, with the national government in charge of administration according to law. Currently, there are no Federal Territories in the country because they were elevated to the category of State within the Venezuelan Federation.

Creation 
The federal territories would be regulated by the organic law that is able to decree its creation in certain areas of the states, whose validity would be subject to completion of a referendum approving the respective and special law federal entity that may be given to a Federal Territory State category, assigning all or part of the land area.

History 
Since 1864, under the government of General Antonio Guzmán Blanco and by Special Act of Congress, the Amazonas and Delta Amacuro Federal Territories were created as territorial political division Federal, until they gained the status of Federal States, via the corresponding Special Act in the year of 1992. On July 4, 1895, President Joaquín Crespo organized the Venezuelan islands in the Caribbean as part of the "Federal territory Colón," then these territories were divided between the State of Nueva Esparta and the Federal Dependencies.

In 1998, Vargas, during the government of Rafael Caldera, was elevated to the category of "Federal Territory" for a short period of time when Municipality Vargas's position, pertaining to the Federal District, was finally elevated to the rank of State in the 1999.

In 2011, the government of the island territory Francisco de Miranda was established, comprising the Las Aves, Los Roques and Orchila islands, north of Venezuela.  The capital is the archipelago of Los Roques.

List

See also 
 Politics of Venezuela

References

External links 
Ley Orgánica de los Territorios Federales
Ley Orgánica que crea el Territorio Federal de Vargas
Ley Especial que Eleva a Categoría de Estado al Territorio Federal Vargas
Ley Especial que Eleva a Categoría de Estado al Territorio Federal Amazonas
Ley Especial que Eleva a Categoría de Estado al Territorio Federal Delta Amacuro

Reform in Venezuela
Subdivisions of Venezuela